King's Copse is a  biological Site of Special Scientific Interest between Chapel Row and Clay Hill in Berkshire. It is in the North Wessex Downs, which is an Area of Outstanding Natural Beauty. The site is private land but a public footpath runs through it.

Geography

King's Copse is a broadleaf, mixed and yew woodland located in a lowland area.

Fauna

The site has the following animals

Mammals

Badger

Reptiles
Grass snake

Flora

The site has the following Flora:

Trees

Birch
Fraxinus
Ulmus glabra
Quercus robur
Hazel
Alder
Acer campestre
Holly
Aspen
Prunus avium
Salix × fragilis
Rowan

Plants

Anemone nemorosa
Teucrium scorodonia
Lonicera periclymenum
Hyacinthoides non-scripta
Potentilla erecta
Sanicula europaea
Ajuga reptans
Filipendula ulmaria
Scrophularia nodosa
Scrophularia aquatica
Lychnis flos-cuculi
Chrysosplenium oppositifolium
Carex sylvatica
Carex remota
Carex strigosa
Urtica dioica
Oenanthe crocata
Luzula pilosa
Adoxa moschatellina
Euphorbia amygdaloides
Primula vulgaris
Viola riviniana
Viola reichenbachiana
Hypericum androsaemum

References

Sites of Special Scientific Interest in Berkshire
Bucklebury